Nat and Alex Wolff are an American pop rock duo from New York, New York, consisting of brothers Nat and Alex Wolff. The siblings are known for their work on the Nickelodeon television series The Naked Brothers Band, which was created and produced by their mother, actress Polly Draper. It was adapted from the self-titled mockumentary film that Draper wrote and directed. The duo's initial teen pop boy band called "The Naked Brothers Band" was depicted as part of its participation in their Nickelodeon series that aired from 2007 to 2009. They have released four full-length albums and have been nominated for several awards.

History

2001–2004: Early years—The Silver Boulders
While Nat was in preschool, he formed a band called The Silver Boulders with his friends, which included David, Thomas, Josh, Walker (son of news journalist Ann Curry), and Cal (son of actress Julianne Moore). Nat wrote his first song titled "Mama Don't Let Me Cry" at the age of five. At the time, Alex was not allowed to be part of the band, as Nat felt it would be unfashionable to have a brother in the same ensemble.

When Nat, who lives in Lower Manhattan of New York City, was four years old, his father, jazz pianist Michael Wolff (bandleader on The Arsenio Hall Show) played Nat music, primarily jazz. One day, Michael overheard Nat teaching himself how to play major chords on the piano; Nat told his father that they were his "proud chords". After hearing the music of The Beatles, Nat became inspired and watched all the group's films including Help!. On the other hand. Alex discovered how to play the saxophone at the age of two and a half. As recalled by the boys' mother, actress Polly Draper (star on ABC's Thirtysomething), Nat and Alex were infants when they arose from a bath proclaiming, "We're the naked brothers band!"

After the September 11 attacks, six-year-old Nat composed the song "Firefighters" for a benefit he performed with his band, staged behind his Lower Manhattan apartment. Alex desired to be part of the concert, and so Nat created "a fake plastic saxophone" for him to play. The charity ended up raising over $45,000 and was donated to the children of the firefighters who were killed during the terrorist attacks. After the band's charity concert, the band performed shows at Christmas parties and wedding ceremonies.

After being inspired by Ringo Starr from the Beatles, Alex chose the drums as an alternative instrument to play. Alex learned how to play, as he viewed tapes of Starr playing, which resulted in him becoming a proficient drummer. This persuaded Nat to allow Alex to join his band. At the age of 6, Nat composed a melody without lyrics. He later desired to compose a song that sounded like The Beach Boys' music. Subsequently, Nat wrote the song "Crazy Car".

In 2003, Nat was featured in his mother's play Getting Into Heaven at The Flea Theater. Nat also performed in The Heart of Baghdad at the same theater.

2004–2009: The Naked Brothers Band
Nat begged his mom to be a child actor by putting signs on his door that said: "I want to be a child actor!" At first, she refused by explaining that it would be too difficult, so she made a compromise with Nat; in 2003, she let him film his own sitcom titled Don't Eat Off My Plate. After that, Nat begged his dad to record a tape in the studio with Alex and him, so Michael arranged a recording session for the three of them in the studio. While Draper saw them recording in the studio, she came up with the idea to make a "mock documentary" about the band as if they were huge like The Beatles. During summer 2004, the film took production at the family's real-life apartment and throughout New York City, at which time Nat was 9 and Alex was 6-and-a-half. Draper wrote and directed The Naked Brothers Band: The Movie, which was designed as an independent family project with a budget under $1,000,000. The film consisted of celebrities who were friends with Draper and Wolff, including Cyndi Lauper, Julianne Moore, Ann Curry, Uma Thurman, Tony Shalhoub, Ricki Lake, Arsenio Hall, and the complete cast of Thirtysomething. The film also included Draper's niece Jesse, her venture capitalist brother Tim, and her nephews William "Billy" and Adam, and Coulter Mulligan. Michael Wolff produced the music with his longtime friend, the music composer Michael A. Levine; Polly Draper, Michael Wolff, and Tim Draper all served as executive producers for the film. Nat Wolff wrote and performed all the songs, except for "That's How It Is", which was written and performed by Alex Wolff.

On October 23, 2005, Draper and Wolff entered the film at the Hamptons International Film Festival, where it won the audience award for family feature film. Meanwhile, Albie Hecht, a former Nickelodeon executive and founder of Spike TV, was in the audience that day. He ended up bringing the film to Nickelodeon, suggesting they develop it into a television series. Tom Asheim, the vice president and general manager of Nickelodeon said:
 "At first, we were intrigued by the idea, but we weren't sure kids would get the vague-tongue-and-check-of-it. Then a bunch of us took it home to our own children and they loved it."

Eventually, the staff at Nickelodeon persuaded Draper to put together a television series after comprising with short, 13 episode seasons over the summer and early autumn, so the boys were able to attend private school throughout most of the school year. Draper recalled, "When Nickelodeon first asked us about doing a series, we said, 'How about a cartoon, so the kids could stay normal?' They said, 'No, we love your kids.'" In the summer through the early fall of 2006, the first season of the self-titled series took production. On January 27, 2007, The Naked Brothers Band: The Movie aired on Nickelodeon, and the self-titled series aired February 3. Polly Draper is the creator, head writer, executive producer, and frequent director of the series, while Albie Hecht is the executive producer and his production company Worldwide Biggies distributes the series. Kidz House Entertainment also distributes the series. It is located at Stage 1, which is a division of Broadway Stages in Greenpoint, Brooklyn where the show is filmed. The series premiere brought Nickelodeon's highest-rated premiere in seven years.

Nat and Alex never really realized how big they were until October 8, 2007. Band members Nat, Alex, Thomas, David, Allie DiMeco (who stars as Rosalina and Nat's crush on the film and TV series), and Qaasim Middleton (who replaced former band-member Josh on the series) had an autograph-signing at Times Square Virgin Megastore for the band's release of their self-titled debut album The Naked Brothers Band. There were 1,500 fans that waited outside of Virgin Megastore for hours; some camped out overnight. They also had a live performance on ABC's Good Morning America with the band's song "I'm Out".

In 2008, the second season of the band's television series aired, premiering on January 26 in Sidekicks. It then ended after a 15-episode run with Polar Bears, which aired on June 6.

On April 15, 2008, the band finally released its second album, I Don't Want To Go To School. The album had a total of 12 tracks, along with two bonus tracks, and a poster. As part of a Wal-Mart special sale, it included a DVD featuring a behind-the-scenes glimpse of the Draper-Wolff family and the siblings' bandmates.

The band then started its first national-tour around the country called Nat & Alex Wolff: Fully Clothed & On Tour, which started on November 1, 2008. Nat and Alex, along with professionally trained musicians that include Jacob Hertzog (music director, guitar and backup vocals), Misty Boyce (keyboards and backup vocals), Chris Muir (bass and backup vocals), and Boris Pelekh (guitar, drums and backup vocals), performed songs from and even some from the upcoming episodes. Some concerts they performed at include the Capital One Bank Theater in New York City, the Theater of the Living Arts in Philadelphia, the Berkeley Performance Center in Boston, The Roxy in Los Angeles, and the House of Blues in Chicago, New Orleans, Florida and California. The tour ended shortly after on December 14, 2008.

The third season of the brothers' show began on October 18, 2008, with the television movie Mystery Girl. The third and final season of The Naked Brothers Band television show aired four TV movies and three holiday specials. The series ended on June 13, 2009, with No School Fools' Day. Many fans wondered the reason for why the show came to an end. There were many reasons, but in the end it was confirmed that the ending of the series was because they wanted to film a 60-episode season which would conflict with the boys' school schedule.

2009–2010: Duo career and touring
After The Naked Brothers Band television show ended, the brothers continued to pursue music but emerged as a duo group because the duo's old band name was owned by Viacom, a trademark of Nickelodeon. The other bandmates — Jake Hertzog and Boris Pelekh on guitar, Chris Muir on bass, and Misty Boyce on keyboards — provided back-up instrumentation.  They had also appeared at the siblings' initial tour in 2008. Following the 2008 tour, the brothers confirmed their first full-length summer tour, titled "Nat and Alex Wolff: Summer Road Trip Tour". It began in June 2009 and ended in early October 2009.

The brothers performed at Pop-Con 2010, alongside Justin Bieber, Selena Gomez, and many other teen performers. Thereafter, the duo performed at the Earth Day 2010 concert in New York and played many new songs there, such as "Fire and Kerosene", "18" or "Disappointed" and others.

After the brothers completed their tour in 2009, they revealed that they were working on a new studio album, post their Nickelodeon TV series. New material was written and recorded during that summer. Two demo tracks — a cover of Bruce Springsteen's song "Dancing In The Dark" and of The Beatles' song, "A Hard Day's Night" — were leaked onto the siblings' official website.

2010–2012: Black Sheep

The brothers began recording their studio album in early 2010, and it was planned to consist of 12 new tracks. Of the writing process, Nat said, "The material is a bit more mature, as I have matured as a [song]writer." Leading up to the album release, the brothers have starred in their own webshow on YouTube, which was written and directed by their mother and their official website produced it. New episodes have been uploaded weekly, most of which featured snippets of tracks from their upcoming album, Black Sheep. The album was to be released in the fall of 2011. The album was produced by their father and Daniel Wise, a client at The Soundmine Recording Studio.

2012–present: Throwbacks, double singles, and Public Places
In October 2013, Nat & Alex Wolff released an album of previously unreleased songs, entitled Throwbacks. The album primarily consisted of songs the musicians wrote during their time on their Nickelodeon show, The Naked Brothers Band.

In 2014, the brothers released a double-single, Cities/It's Just Love. Three months later, they released two more singles, "Last Station" and "Rules". On October 7, an additional double-single, consisting of "Where I'm Goin by Alex, and "Rock Star" by Nat, was released. An alternate version of Rock Star was also featured in the film Nat co-starred in Palo Alto.

In November 2016, they announced a new EP titled Public Places was available for pre-order with the lead single "Rollin' Around" being available as an instant download when the album was pre-ordered. Public Places was released December 16, 2016.

Musical style and influences

The brothers' career was inspired by their favourite rock band, The Beatles. Alex learned to play the drums by watching Ringo Starr on the Anthology tapes. This was the reason the brothers wanted to be in a band. Nat has also said that the two of them were very inspired by Nirvana, the Killers, The Doors, and Coldplay. Originally, the band was a bubblegum pop-style group, over time however, the band evolved to have a more rock-based sound.

Band members
Nat Wolff – vocals, guitar, keyboards, bass (2004–present)
Alex Wolff – vocals, guitar, piano, drums (2004–present)
Chris Muir – bass, backing vocals (2008-2009)
Jake Hertzog – guitar (2008-2009)
Boris Pelekh – guitar, drums, backing vocals (2008-2009)
Misty Boyce – keyboards, backing vocals (2008-2009)

Discography

Albums

Singles
"The Naked Brothers Band"
 Crazy Car (2005)
 If That's Not Love (2007)
 I Don't Want To Go To School (2008)
 Face In The Hall (2008)

"Nat & Alex Wolff"
 Thump, Thump, Thump (2011)
 Cities / It's Just Love (2014)
 Last Station / Rules (2014)
 Where I'm Goin' / Rock Star (2014)
 Cool Kids / Note (2019)

Concert and tours

Awards

References

External links
 The Naked Brothers Band being interviewed at the New York Times Center Stage
 A TV Family Bound by Blood and a Band
 

2001 establishments in New York City
American boy bands
American pop music groups
American pop rock music groups
Child musical groups
Columbia Records artists
Family musical groups
Musical groups established in 2001
Musical groups from New York City
The Naked Brothers Band members
Rock music groups from New York (state)
Sibling musical duos